Emery Oakland Barnes (December 15, 1929 – June 1, 1998) was a Canadian professional football player and politician.

Background
Born in Louisiana and raised in Oregon, Barnes was a gifted athlete, and was an alternate high jumper for the 1952 US Olympic Track and Field team. He played football at the University of Oregon (from where he received his B.Sc) and was selected by the National Football League's Green Bay Packers in the 1954 NFL Draft (10th round, 207th overall.) He played two games for the Packers in 1956, but had much more success in the Canadian Football League with the B.C. Lions. He played 3 years, from 1962 to 1964, for a total of 30 games and was a Grey Cup champion in 1964 (though an injury prevented him from playing in the Grey Cup game). He also received a Bachelor of Social Work degree from the University of British Columbia.

Political career
Barnes worked as a social worker before entering politics. First elected to the British Columbia legislature in 1972, and re-elected four consecutive times, he served the people of British Columbia until 1996. Barnes and fellow NDP MLA Rosemary Brown were the first black politicians elected to a legislative office in British Columbia in the 20th century. He was particularly concerned with issues relating to social justice, human rights, and poverty.

Elected Speaker of the Legislature in 1994, Barnes was also the first black person to hold this position in any Canadian province.

The city of Vancouver has named a park after him in his memory, Emery Barnes Park at 1100 Seymour Street.

Barnes is buried in Robinson Memorial Park Cemetery, in Coquitlam, British Columbia.  The headstone shows his full name as "Emery Oakland Barnes."

Constance Barnes, his daughter, was an elected member of the Vancouver Park Board and stood for the 2015 federal election with the NDP in the riding of Vancouver Centre.

References

External links
 Detailed Biography of Emery Barnes from University of Washington (wayback machine)
Gail Ito, Barnes, Emery (1929-1998) at blackpast.org

1929 births
1998 deaths
Speakers of the Legislative Assembly of British Columbia
BC Lions players
Green Bay Packers players
African-American players of Canadian football
American players of Canadian football
American football defensive linemen
American emigrants to Canada
Black Canadian track and field athletes
Black Canadian politicians
Canadian people of African-American descent
Canadian Protestants
Canadian sportsperson-politicians
Canadian social workers
Canadian football defensive linemen
Sportspeople from New Orleans
Canadian football people from Vancouver
Politicians from New Orleans
Politicians from Vancouver
Players of American football from New Orleans
Players of Canadian football from New Orleans
Players of American football from Oregon
Oregon Ducks football players
British Columbia New Democratic Party MLAs
University of British Columbia School of Social Work alumni
University of Oregon alumni
History of Black people in British Columbia
20th-century African-American sportspeople
African-American history of Oregon